Mohammad A. Khogaini was an Afghan field hockey player who competed at the 1948 Summer Olympic Games, playing in all three of his team's matches.

References

`

External links
 

Afghan male field hockey players
Olympic field hockey players of Afghanistan
Field hockey players at the 1948 Summer Olympics
Possibly living people
Year of birth missing